Gérard De Gezelle (born 1903, date of death unknown) was a Belgian rower. He competed in the men's eight event at the 1924 Summer Olympics.

References

External links
 

1903 births
Year of death missing
Belgian male rowers
Olympic rowers of Belgium
Rowers at the 1924 Summer Olympics
Place of birth missing